Bjørkum is a Norwegian surname. Notable people with the surname include:

Andreas Bjørkum (1932–2014), Norwegian philologist
Erik Bjørkum (born 1965), Norwegian sailor
Olav Bjørkum (1859–1936), Norwegian politician

Norwegian-language surnames